Noy is a 2010 Filipino independent drama film directed by Dondon Santos. It stars Coco Martin and Erich Gonzales and was released under Star Cinema. The film is rated "A" by the Cinema Evaluation Board of the Philippines. It was selected as the Filipino entry for the Best Foreign Language Film at the 83rd Academy Awards. However, the film didn't make the final shortlist.

Plot
Forced to find a job as his family's breadwinner, Noy (Coco Martin) poses as a journalist commissioned to come up with a documentary following the campaign trail of his namesake and top presidential bet, Sen. Benigno "Noynoy" Aquino III for the 2010 Philippine National elections.

It started when Noy, who has an ambition to be a news reporter, faked his school records to enter a major TV station, owned by Jane (Vice Ganda). As a reporter, he was assigned to cover Sen. Noynoy's presidential campaigns everywhere. Meanwhile, his girlfriend, Divine (Erich Gonzales), initially discouraged him, was forced to agree. He covered Sen. Aquino's campaigns from Luzon, Visayas and Mindanao, every time, from sunrise to midnight, from live coverage to record editing. His older brother, Bong (Joem Bascon), crippled by polio, jealous at Noy at his lucky streak, unintentionally joined a notorious group at drug dealing.

Meanwhile, some jealous TV presenters investigated Noy's background. They reported it on Jane. Noy was immediately summoned and fired when they found out about his fake identity, but gave him one last shot to cover Sen. Aquino's campaign in Tarlac.

He returned in his home in Artex Compound, just to see his brother being mauled by two thugs. He was spotted and killed by one of the thugs, falling his body in the floodwater.

In the end of the film, Noy's family observed his death by lighting in the front of his portrait. Simultaneously, Senator Noynoy made his speech in front of the crowds gathered during his campaign.

The film, infused with actual documentary footage inter-cut with dramatic scenes mixed with countless presidential campaign slogans, deals with themes of poverty, survival and hope for the Filipino family.

Cast
Coco Martin as Manolo "Noy" Agapito
Cherry Pie Picache as Letty
Joem Bascon as Bong
Erich Gonzales as Divine
Cheska Billiones as Tata
Baron Geisler as Caloy
Vice Ganda as Jane
Ketchup Eusebio as Harold
Pen Medina as Nick
Jhong Hilario as Drug Thug 1
Kristofer King† as Drug Thug 2
Tess Antonio
Janus del Prado
Ping Medina
Neil Ryan Sese
Karen Davila
Liz Uy
Boy Abunda
Kris Aquino
James Yap
Ai-Ai de las Alas
Mariel Rodriguez
Bianca Gonzales
Dingdong Dantes
Marian Rivera
Jodi Sta. Maria
Dennis Padilla
Claudine Barretto
Sharon Cuneta
Ogie Alcasid
Benigno Aquino III† as himself
Katie Meads as Naughty Noy
Ciana

TV special
In observance of the death of Noynoy Aquino who died last June 24, 2021, the film was shown on Kapamilya Channel, Kapamilya Online Live and A2Z on June 27, 2021.

References

External links
 Noy The Movie Official Website
 

2010 films
2010 romantic comedy films
Star Cinema films
2010s Tagalog-language films
Philippine romantic comedy films
2010s English-language films
Films directed by Dondon Santos